U-Piter was a Russian rock band from Saint-Petersburg. The group was formed by Vyacheslav Butusov in 2001. The group disbanded in 2017.

Members

Final line-up 
 Vyacheslav Butusov - lead vocals, guitar
 Yuri Kasparyan - guitar
  - drums
 Aleksey Andreyev - bass guitar, keyboards, guitar

Former members 
 - keyboards, wind instruments
 Sergey Vyrvich - bass guitar

Discography

References

External links 
 

Musical groups from Saint Petersburg
Russian rock music groups